Robert Steven Kapito (born February 8, 1957) is an American businessman and investor. He is a founder and president of the New York City-based investment management firm BlackRock.

Early life and education

Kapito is of Jewish ancestry. He earned an MBA from Harvard Business School in Cambridge, Massachusetts (HBS) in 1983 after completing a BS degree in economics from the Wharton School of the University of Pennsylvania.  Kapito met his wife Ellen when she was a student at the University of Pennsylvania School of Nursing.

Career

Kapito joined First Boston in 1979 after graduating from Wharton and started in the Public Finance Department. He was hired by Larry Fink to work at First Boston, where they were instrumental in pioneering the mortgage-backed security market in the United States.

Kapito left First Boston to complete his MBA degree and returned to the firm in 1983 in the Mortgage Products Group. In 1988, Kapito left First Boston along with Fink and founded BlackRock under the umbrella of the private equity firm Blackstone Group as partners. Kapito worked closely with Fink at BlackRock, where he developed a reputation as an aggressive and loyal supporter of Fink.

In 2022, he warned about product shortages and said that "a very entitled generation that has never had to sacrifice" was experiencing inflation for the first time.

Kapito serves as a member of the board of trustees of the Wharton School of the University of Pennsylvania and as a member of a Harvard Kennedy School Executive Education Faculty. He is also president of the board of directors for the Hope & Heroes Children's Cancer Fund and president of the board of directors for Periwinkle Theatre for Youth, a national non-profit arts-in-education organization.

In 2012, he received the Gustave L. Levy Award from the United Jewish Appeal Federation of New York for his donations.

Kapito is scheduled to speak at the November 2022 Global Financial Leaders' Investment Summit, with the Hong Kong Democracy Council claiming that his presence, along with other financial executives, legitimizes the Hong Kong government's whitewashing of the erosion of freedoms in the city. Several members of Congress also warned that US financial executives should not attend the Summit, saying "Their presence only serves to legitimise the swift dismantling of Hong Kong's autonomy, free press and the rule of law by Hong Kong authorities acting along with the Chinese Communist Party."

References

External links

Official website

American financial company founders
American financiers
American investors
20th-century American Jews
American money managers
BlackRock people
Harvard Business School alumni
Jewish American bankers
Living people
Wharton School of the University of Pennsylvania alumni
1957 births
21st-century American Jews